The 2004 Davis Cup was the 93rd edition of the tournament between nations in men's tennis. A total of 130 nations participated in the tournament.  In the final, Spain defeated the United States at the Estadio de La Cartuja in Seville, Spain, on 3–5 December, giving Spain their second title.

World Group

Draw

First round losers compete in play-off ties with Zonal Group I Qualifiers.

Final

World Group play-offs 

Date: 24–26 September

Americas Zone

Group I
Participating Teams
  — relegated to Group II in 2005
  — advanced to World Group Qualifying Round
 
  — advanced to World Group Qualifying Round

Group II
Participating Teams
 
 
 
  — relegated to Group III in 2005
 
  — promoted to Group I in 2005
  — relegated to Group III in 2005

Group III
Participating Teams
 
  — promoted to Group II in 2005
 
 
  — promoted to Group II in 2005
  — relegated to Group IV in 2005
 
  — relegated to Group IV in 2005

Group IV
Participating Teams
 
 
 
  Eastern Caribbean
  — promoted to Group III in 2005
  — promoted to Group III in 2005

Asia/Oceania Zone

Group I
Participating Teams
 
 
 
  — advanced to World Group Qualifying Round
  — relegated to Group II in 2005
 
  — advanced to World Group Qualifying Round

Group II
Participating Teams
  — promoted to Group I in 2005
  — relegated to Group III in 2005
 
 
 
  — relegated to Group III in 2005

Group III
Participating Teams
 
  — relegated to Group IV in 2005
  — promoted to Group II in 2005
  Pacific Oceania — promoted to Group II in 2005
 
  — relegated to Group IV in 2005

Group IV
Participating Teams
 
 
 
 
 
 
  — promoted to Group III in 2005
 
  — promoted to Group III in 2005

Europe/Africa Zone

Group I
Participating Teams
  — advanced to World Group Qualifying Round
  — relegated to Group II in 2005
  — advanced to World Group Qualifying Round
  — advanced to World Group Qualifying Round
  — relegated to Group II in 2005
 
 
  — advanced to World Group Qualifying Round

Group II
Participating Teams
 
 
  — withdrew; relegated to Group III in 2005
  — relegated to Group III in 2005
 
 
  — relegated to Group III in 2005
  — promoted to Group I in 2005
 
 
 
 
  — promoted to Group I in 2005
 
  — relegated to Group III in 2005

Group III

Venue I
Participating Teams
  — promoted to Group II in 2005
  — promoted to Group II in 2005

Venue II
Participating Teams
  — relegated to Group IV in 2005
 
  — promoted to Group II in 2005
 
 
 
  — promoted to Group II in 2005

Group IV

Venue I
Participating Teams
 
 
  — promoted to Group III in 2005
  — promoted to Group III in 2005

Venue II
Participating Teams
  — promoted to Group III in 2005
  — promoted to Group III in 2005

References

External links
Official Site

 
Davis Cup
Davis Cups by year